Dagmar Rosita Astrid Libertas, Duchess of Marlborough (née Douglas, sometimes Spencer-Churchill; born 26 September 1943, Madrid), is a British artist of Swedish and German descent. She was the third wife of John Spencer-Churchill, 11th Duke of Marlborough, from 1972 until their divorce in 2008.

Early life 

She was born as Countess Rosita Douglas in Madrid, Spain, the younger daughter of Count Carl Ludvig Douglas (1908–1961), a Swedish nobleman and diplomat who was Swedish Ambassador to Brazil, and his Prussian wife Ottora Maria Haas-Heye (1910–2001), maternal granddaughter of Prince Philip, 1st Prince of Eulenburg and Hertefeld, by his wife Augusta, Countess Sandels.

She grew up as a diplomat's child, travelling all over the world but spent her summers at the family home, the castle of Stjärnorp, which belonged to Rosita's paternal grandfather, General Archibald Douglas.

Rosita Douglas attended schools in Sweden and in Washington DC. She studied arts at Sweden's renowned art school Konstfack in Stockholm, and then at the École nationale supérieure des arts décoratifs in Paris. While in Paris she also worked for the famed fashion designer, Emanuel Ungaro and later as a freelance designer in London.

Marriage and divorce
On 20 May 1972, Rosita Douglas became the third wife of John Spencer-Churchill, 11th Duke of Marlborough, an Englishman who had inherited his father's estates and titles two months before. She thus became Duchess of Marlborough, with a number of residences which included Blenheim Palace in Oxfordshire. They had three children: 
 Lord Richard Spencer-Churchill (born 1973; died four months later as an infant)
 Lord Edward Albert Charles Spencer-Churchill (born 1974), who married Kimberly Hammerstroem.
 Lady Alexandra Elizabeth Spencer-Churchill (born 1977).
The Duke and Duchess were divorced in 2008.

Rosita Marlborough as a painter
In 1992, the duchess returned to art as a professional. She has had two solo exhibitions in London and one in Palm Beach. Her first show in London in 1995 featured figurative paintings. Since then, she traveled to Morocco in 1996, and her paintings of Moroccan themes sold briskly.  She has since exhibited and sold paintings in  London, New York, and Palm Beach. Her paintings and sculptures are in collections around the world.  She has also had a retrospective Rosita Marlborough: A Retrospective at the Elizabeth de C. Wilson Museum at the Southern Vermont Arts Center from 15 July to 1 September 2006.

Family connections
Rosita Marlborough is a maternal aunt and godmother of Sophie, Hereditary Princess of Liechtenstein, and maternal aunt of her sisters, Duchess Marie-Caroline, Duchess Helene, Duchess Elisabeth and Duchess Maria-Anna, who all are princesses of Bavaria. Her elder sister Princess Elisabeth (b. 1940) is married to Prince Max, Duke in Bavaria, heir presumptive to the Headship of the Royal House of Bavaria and also heir presumptive to the Jacobite pretensions to the thrones of England, Scotland, Ireland, and France. Her elder brother is Swedish businessman Count Gustaf Douglas.

Her maternal aunt was Libertas Schulze-Boysen née Haas-Heye (1913–1942), who with her husband, Harro Schulze-Boysen (1909–1942), was executed by the Nazis. Her maternal great-grandfather was Prince Philipp, 1st Prince of Eulenburg and Hertefeld (a close friend of Emperor Wilhelm II of Germany), whose youngest child, Princess Viktoria Ada Astrid Agnes of Eulenburg and Hertefeld (1886–1967), was married in 1909 (divorced in 1921) to professor Otto Ludwig Haas-Heye (1879–1959) and had issue, including two daughters. Rosita descends through both her mother and father from medieval Scandinavian nobility and rulers. However, her father's patriline is Scottish, of the  Swedish-German branch, descended via two obscure generations from the youngest son of James Douglas, 1st Baron of Dalkeith, ancestor of the 15th century Earls of Morton. All these Douglasses were of the Morton branch of the ancient Clan Douglas.

References

External links 
 , including official biography
 Biography
 Descendants of Count Carl Israel Douglas and his wife, an illegitimate daughter of a Grand Duke of Baden (patrilineal ancestors of Rosita), also archived at family history website. Retrieved 12 December 2008.
 Partial ancestry of Rosita Marlborough with ancestors no. 14 and 15 being her parents.

1943 births
Living people
British painters
Swedish emigrants to the United Kingdom
English duchesses by marriage
Rosita Spencer-Churchill, Duchess of Marlborough
Rosita Spencer-Churchill, Duchess of Marlborough